Peter Bares (16 January 1936 – 2 March 2014) was a German organist and composer. He was best known for his church music. He was born in Essen.

Bares died on 2 March 2014 in Rhineland-Palatinate. He was 78 years old.

References

External links
  

1936 births
2014 deaths
German male composers
German composers
German organists
German male organists
Musicians from Essen
20th-century German musicians
20th-century German male musicians